Ajibola Joshua Odunayo Afolarin Alese (born 17 January 2001) is an English professional footballer who plays for Sunderland as a central defender.

Club career

West Ham United
Alese began his career with West Ham United, turning professional in July 2018. He moved on loan to Accrington Stanley in September 2019.

Alese made his West Ham debut on 22 September 2020, playing the full 90 minutes of a 5–1 EFL Cup third round victory over Hull City.

On 1 February 2021, Alese moved on loan to Cambridge United. He made only two appearances during his loan as Cambridge won promotion to League One.

Sunderland 
On 15 July 2022, Alese signed a 3-year deal with Sunderland for an undisclosed fee. He made his Black Cats debut on 6 August 2022, replacing Jack Clarke in the last few minutes of a 3-2 win against Bristol City F.C. Alese made his first league start on 14 September 2022 against Reading and was booked for time-wasting with nearly 30 minutes of the match still to play. He scored his first Sunderland goal, also his first goal in senior football, on 17 September in a 2-2 away draw against Watford.

International career
Born in England, Alese is of Nigerian descent. He has represented the England under-16 team. He was a member of the England under-17 squad that hosted the 2018 UEFA European Under-17 Championship and started in the semi-final defeat against the Netherlands.

Alese has also represented the England under-18 team and on 10 September 2018 played the whole game as England won away against France under-18. In September 2019, Alese was called up to the England under-19 team.

Alese made his U20 debut during a 2–0 victory over Wales at St George's Park on 13 October 2020.

Style of play
Dmitri Halajko, who managed Alese at under-23 level at West Ham, has praised multiple attributes of Alese, saying "he’s quick, good on the ball, he has a nice left foot, good range of passing and defends well in one-on-one situations", as well as his leadership skills, a trait former England U19 manager Paul Simpson has echoed. Accrington manager John Coleman has also commended Alese's versatility, saying "he is capable of playing left-back".

Personal life

Born in Islington and raised in Romford, Alese is of Nigerian descent and eligible to play for Nigeria as well as England.

Career statistics

References

2001 births
Living people
English footballers
England youth international footballers
Association football defenders
West Ham United F.C. players
Accrington Stanley F.C. players
Cambridge United F.C. players
Sunderland A.F.C. players
English Football League players
Black British sportspeople
English people of Nigerian descent
Footballers from the London Borough of Islington